Ernest Graham may refer to:

 Ernest R. Graham (architect) (1866–1936), American architect
 Ernest R. Graham (politician) (1886–1957), American politician
 Ernie Graham (1946–2001), singer-songwriter

See also
 Earnest Graham (born 1980), NFL running back

Ernest Graham-Little (1867–1950), dermatologist and British Member of Parliament